The following is a list of notable deaths in June 2008.

Entries for each day are listed alphabetically by surname. A typical entry lists information in the following sequence:
 Name, age, country of citizenship at birth, subsequent country of citizenship (if applicable), reason for notability, cause of death (if known), and reference.

June 2008

1
Anne d'Harnoncourt, 64, American chief executive of the Philadelphia Museum of Art, natural causes.
Brian Doyle, 77, Australian Olympic bronze medal-winning (1956) rower.
Maurizio Galli, 75, Italian Roman Catholic bishop, Bishop of Fidenza (1998–2007).
Al Jones, 62, British folk singer.
Terry Keane, 68, Irish columnist and fashion journalist, long illness.
Alton Kelley, 67, American graphic designer and psychedelic artist, after long illness.
Tommy Lapid, 76, Israeli journalist and politician, deputy prime minister (2003–2004), cancer.
Pat Regan, 53, British anti-gun activist, stabbing.
Yves Saint Laurent, 71, French fashion designer, founder of Yves Saint Laurent brand, brain cancer.
Jon Vickers, 82, British trade union leader.
Alicia Zubasnabar de De la Cuadra, 92, Argentine human rights activist, first President of the Grandmothers of the Plaza de Mayo.

2
Sheela Basrur, 51, Canadian health administrator, Toronto medical officer of health during SARS crisis, leiomyosarcoma.
Sheriff Mustapha Dibba, 71, Gambian politician, first Vice President (1965–1975), speaker (2002–2006), heart attack.
Bo Diddley, 79, American rock and roll and blues singer, songwriter, and guitarist, heart failure.
Nodar Dzhordzhikiya, 86, Georgian Olympic silver medal-winning (1952) basketball player.
Ferenc Fejtő, 98, Hungarian-born French historian and journalist, after long illness.
Hiroshi Inoue, 90, Japanese entomologist
Ángel Malvicino, 87, Argentine Olympic rower.
Ken Naganuma, 77, Japanese football player and manager.
Mel Ferrer, 90, American actor, film director and producer (War and Peace, Lili).
Lois Roisman, 70, American philanthropist and playwright, heart failure.
Paul Sills, 80, American theater director and comedian, co-founder of The Second City improv troupe, pneumonia.
Frank Tsosie Thompson, 87, American Navajo code talker and World War II veteran.

3
Ken Aitken, 79, Australian footballer.
John A. Choi Jae-seon, 96, South Korean Bishop of Pusan (1957–1973).
John Creaney, 74, Northern Irish barrister.
Pat Egan, 90, Canadian ice hockey defenceman (Boston Bruins).
Trevor Kaine, 80, Australian chief minister of the ACT (1989–1991).
Grigory Romanov, 85, Russian first secretary of the Leningrad obkom (1970–1983), Politburo member (1976–1985).
Carl H. Stevens Jr., 78, American evangelist, heart failure.

4
Travis Alexander, 30, American motivational speaker, homicide by stabbing.
John Armitt, 82, New Zealand wrestler.
Matthew J. Bruccoli, 76, American professor of English at University of South Carolina, expert on F. Scott Fitzgerald.
Jack Byrne, 57, Canadian member of Newfoundland and Labrador House of Assembly, mayor of LB-MC-OC (1986–1993).
Ruby Chow, 87, American Chinese restaurateur.
Bill Finegan, 91, American jazz arranger and bandleader, pneumonia.
Ivan Herasymov, 87, Ukrainian politician, oldest member of the Verkhovna Rada.
John Long, 94, British Anglican priest, Archdeacon of Ely (1970–1981).
Harriet McBryde Johnson, 50, American attorney and disability rights activist.
Agata Mróz-Olszewska, 26, Polish international volleyball player, myelodysplastic syndrome.
Frank Muller, 57, Dutch-born American actor and audiobook narrator.
Curtis Osborne, 38, American murderer, execution by lethal injection.
Jonathan Routh, 80, British co-star of UK Candid Camera.
Nikos Sergianopoulos, 55, Greek actor, homicide by stabbing.
James Young, 78, American White House physician (John F. Kennedy, Lyndon B. Johnson).

5
Rajendra Agnihotri, 70, Indian politician.
Frank Blackmore, 92, British traffic engineer and inventor of the mini-roundabout.
Angus Calder, 66, British historian and writer, lung cancer.
Dick Evans, 86, Australian politician, member of the New South Wales Legislative Council (1969–1978).
Colin Kay, 82, New Zealand Mayor of Auckland (1980–1983), stroke.
Misha Lajovic, 86, Slovenian-born Australian politician, Senator for New South Wales (1975–1985).
Jacklyn H. Lucas, 80, American World War II veteran, youngest marine to be awarded the Medal of Honor, cancer.
Eugenio Montejo, 70, Venezuelan poet, essayist and ambassador, stomach cancer.
Bruce Purchase, 69, New Zealand-born British actor.
Rubén Váldez, 85, Peruvian Olympic shooter.
Vic Wilson, 87, British cricketer, captain of Yorkshire, Wisden Cricketer of the Year (1961).

6
Bobby Anderson, 75, American actor (It's a Wonderful Life), cancer.
Jimmy Croll, 88, American Hall of Fame thoroughbred race horse trainer.
David Mark Hill, 48, American spree killer.
Saeko Himuro, 51, Japanese novelist and essayist, lung cancer.
Ray Mallouf, 89, American football player (Chicago Cardinals).
Gene Persson, 74, American theatrical and film producer (You're a Good Man, Charlie Brown).
László Péter, 78, Hungarian historian.
Ferenc Sánta, 81, Hungarian author.
Ed Tchorzewski, 65, Canadian politician, Saskatchewan finance minister and Legislative Assembly member, cancer.
Paul Tessier, 90, French plastic surgeon.
Victor Wégria, 71, Belgian football player (Belgium, RFC Liège).
Dwight White, 58, American football player (Pittsburgh Steelers), complications from back surgery.
Francisco José Ynduráin, 67, Spanish physicist.

7
Ed Beatty, 76, American football player (San Francisco 49ers, Pittsburgh Steelers).
Jimmy Bonthrone, 76, Scottish footballer and manager (Aberdeen F.C.).
Bill Coday, 66, American singer, stroke.
Nasteh Dahir, 36, Somali journalist, vice-president of the National Union of Somali Journalists, shooting.
Thomas Erskine, 91, Australian politician, member of the New South Wales Legislative Council (1970–1978).
Rudy Fernandez, 55, Filipino action movie star, periampullary cancer.
Joseph Kabui, 53/54, Papua New Guinean secessionist, first president of the Autonomous Region of Bougainville, heart attack.
Mustafa Khalil, 88, Egyptian prime minister (1978–1980), architect of the Camp David Accords peace treaty.
Roelof Koops, 98, Dutch Olympic speed skater.
Jim McKay, 86, American sportscaster (Wide World of Sports, 12 Olympic Games), natural causes.
Dino Risi, 91, Italian film director (Il Sorpasso, Profumo di donna), natural causes.
Horst Skoff, 39, Austrian tennis player, heart attack. 
Erick Wujcik, 57, American game designer, pancreatic cancer.

8
Šaban Bajramović, 72, Serbian Romani musician, heart attack.
Charles-Noël Barbès, 93, Canadian politician, Member of Parliament (1957–1958).
Florența Crăciunescu, 53, Romanian Olympic bronze medal-winning (1984) discus thrower.
Gene Damschroder, 86, American politician, member of the Ohio House of Representatives (1973–1983), plane crash.
Jake Flake, 72, American politician, Arizona representative (1997–2005) and senator since 2005, heart attack.
Michitaka Kinami, 87, Japanese Olympic hurdler.
Danilo Lagbas, 56, Filipino politician, member of the House of Representatives since 2004, lung and liver cancer.
Abdul Samad Rohani, 25, Afghan journalist, shooting.
Peter Rühmkorf, 78, German writer, cancer. 
Edith Derby Williams, 90, American historian, granddaughter of Theodore Roosevelt.

9
Karen Asrian, 28, Armenian chess grandmaster, heart attack.
Algis Budrys, 77, American science fiction writer.
Peter Jon de Vos, 69, American diplomat.
Nan Hoover, 77, American-born Dutch artist.
Alton W. Knappenberger, 84, American Medal of Honor recipient.
Esteban Mellino, 63, Argentine actor, heart attack.
Josef Minsch, 66, Swiss Olympic alpine skier. 
Elly M. Peterson, 94, American first female chair of Michigan Republican Party (1965–1969).

10
Chinghiz Aitmatov, 79, Kyrgyzstani writer (The Day Lasts More Than a Hundred Years), respiratory and renal failure.
Gesner Armand, 71, Haitian painter.
Eliot Asinof, 88, American writer (Eight Men Out), pneumonia.
Ralph Bacerra, 70, American ceramic artist, lung cancer.
David Brierly, 73, British actor, voice of K-9 on Doctor Who, cancer.
Tyrone Jones, 46, American Canadian football linebacker (Winnipeg Blue Bombers), brain cancer.
Kipkalya Kones, 56, Kenyan politician, plane crash.
Lorna Laboso, 47, Kenyan politician, plane crash.
John Rauch, 80, American football coach and player.

11
Lamidi Adedibu, 80, Nigerian politician.
Ove Andersson, 70, Swedish rally driver and principal of the Toyota F1 racing team, rally crash.
Reid Bryson, 88, American meteorologist.
Brian Budd, 56, Canadian soccer player.
Jean Desailly, 87, French actor.
Mitch Frerotte, 43, American football player (Buffalo Bills), heart attack.
Sir Frank Hassett, 90, Australian head of the Australian Defence Force (1975–1977).
Taras Kermauner, 78, Slovenian literary historian, philosopher and playwright.
Adam Ledwoń, 34, Polish footballer, suicide.
Anne Clark Martindell, 93, American politician and diplomat, ambassador to New Zealand (1979–1981).
Mickey McMahan, 77, American big band musician (Les Brown and Lawrence Welk orchestras), neuropathy.
James Reaney, 81, Canadian playwright.
Gunnar Solum, 78, Norwegian politician.
*Võ Văn Kiệt, 85, Vietnamese politician, reformist, prime minister (1991–1997).

12
Ward Boston, 84, American Navy attorney, investigated USS Liberty incident, complications from pneumonia.
Danny Davis, 83, American country musician and trumpet player, cardiac arrest.
Miroslav Dvořák, 56, Czech ice hockey player (Philadelphia Flyers), throat cancer.
Charlie Jones, 77, American sportscaster, heart attack.
Dan Kuykendall, 83, American politician, representative from Tennessee (1967–1975).
Stewart Rawlings Mott, 70, American philanthropist, cancer.
Gunther Stent, 84, German molecular biologist, pneumonia.
Derek Tapscott, 75, British football international (Arsenal, Cardiff City, Wales).

13
Mel Krause, 80, American college baseball coach and player, myeloid leukemia.
Maryon Lane, 77, South African ballerina.
Bruce Lester, 96, British actor.
John Malcolm, 72, Scottish actor.
Tim Russert, 58, American journalist and television host (Meet the Press), coronary thrombosis.
Sir Dennis Weatherstone, 77, British banker, cancer.

14
*Syed Wajid Ali, 97, Pakistani business magnate, member of the IOC.
Jerry M. Anderson, 74, American academic administrator.
Charles Albert Buswell, 94, American Roman Catholic bishop of Pueblo (1959–1979).
*Chu Fusung, 93, Taiwanese foreign minister (1979–1987).
Kees Fens, 78, Dutch essayist.
Jamelão, 95, Brazilian samba singer, multiple organ failure.
Alan Johnston, Lord Johnston, 66, British judge, heart attack.
Rafael del Pino, 87, Spanish businessman.
Emilio Óscar Rabasa, 84, Mexican secretary of foreign affairs (1970–1975), heart failure. (Spanish)
Esbjörn Svensson, 44, Swedish jazz musician, diving accident.
Werner Vetterli, 79, Swiss Olympic modern pentathlete.

15
Mel Agee, 39, American football player (Atlanta Falcons), heart attack.
Thangamma Appakutty, 83, Sri Lankan social activist and educator.
Franklin Otis Booth, Jr., 84, American billionaire, Los Angeles Times executive, amyotrophic lateral sclerosis.
John Buzhardt, 71, American baseball player (1958–1968).
Ray Getliffe, 94, Canadian ice hockey player, liver cancer.
Johnathan Goddard, 27, American football player, motorcycle accident.
Billy Muffett, 77, American baseball pitcher.
Walter Netsch, 88, American architect, pneumonia.
Ole-Jørgen Nilsen, 72, Norwegian actor and theatre director, Bechterew's disease.
Tony Schwartz, 84, American co-creator of President Johnson's "Daisy ad", heart valve stenosis.
Jon Tecedor, 32, Spanish weightlifter, motorcycle accident.
Stan Winston, 62, American special effects and make-up artist (Jurassic Park, The Terminator, Aliens), Oscar winner (1987, 1992, 1994), multiple myeloma.

16
Tom Compernolle, 32, Belgian national 5000m and cross country running champion, truck crash. 
Mike Dukes, 72, American professional football player, traffic accident.
Gareth Jones, 28, Welsh rugby union player (Neath), complications of neck injury during game.
Margaret Kitchin, 94, British pianist.
René Paul, 87, British Olympic fencer.
Bert Shepard, 87, American baseball pitcher (Washington Senators).
Mario Rigoni Stern, 86, Italian writer and World War II veteran.
David Topliss, 58, British rugby league footballer, heart attack.
Caylee Anthony, 2, American murder victim.

17
Ingela Agardh, 59, Swedish journalist and television presenter, breast cancer.
Henry Beckman, 86, Canadian character actor and screenwriter.
Sarah Bryant, 26, British soldier, improvised explosive device.
Henry Chadwick, 87, British theologian, dean of Christ Church, Oxford (1969–1979).
Cyd Charisse, 86, American actress and dancer (Singin' in the Rain, The Band Wagon), heart attack.
Hewitt Crane, 81, American computer engineer, complications of Alzheimer's disease.
Wally Denny, 101, American deputy chief scout of Scouts Canada.
Davey Lee, 83, American child actor.
Henryk Mandelbaum, 85, Polish survivor of the Auschwitz-Birkenau concentration camp.
Tsutomu Miyazaki, 45, Japanese serial killer, execution by hanging.
Josef Pohnetal, 83, Austrian Olympic cyclist.
Mark Sacks, 54, British philosopher, prostate cancer.
Michael Shernoff, 57, American AIDS activist, pancreatic cancer.

18
Jean Delannoy, 100, French film director (La symphonie pastorale, The Hunchback of Notre Dame, Les amitiés particulières).
Stella Greenall, 81, British education activist.
Marion Jorgensen, 96, American philanthropist and civic leader.
Miyuki Kanbe, 24, Japanese actress, heart failure.
Ed Lorraine, 80, Canadian politician and farmer.
Tasha Tudor, 92, American author and illustrator.

19
David Caminer, 92, British computer pioneer.
Tim Carter, 40, British football goalkeeper (Sunderland, Millwall), goalkeeping coach, suspected suicide by hanging.
Cheikh Amadou Fall, 62, Senegalese Olympic basketball player. 
Anselm Genders, 88, British clergyman, Bishop of Bermuda (1977–1982).
Barun Sengupta, 74, Indian journalist, after long illness.
Bennie Swain, 77, American basketball player (Boston Celtics), cancer.
Bomber Wells, 77, British cricketer.

20
Mohammed al Janahi, Emirati film and theatre actor, art director.
Wilber Hardee, 89, American founder of Hardee's fast food restaurant.
James Earl Reed, 49, American convicted murderer, execution by electric chair.
Jean-Pierre Thystère Tchicaya, 72, Congolese politician.
Bruce Trevorrow, 51, Australian first member of the "Stolen Generations" to receive compensation.

21
Harry J. Aleo, 88, American businessman.
Adalberto Almeida y Merino, 92, Mexican prelate.
Scott Kalitta, 46, American drag racer (NHRA), race crash.
Kermit Love, 91, American costume designer, Muppets puppeteer and creator, heart failure.
William Vince, 44, Canadian film producer (Capote, Air Bud), cancer.
Freddie Williams, 65, British businessman and bookmaker, heart attack.

22
Timothy Ansah, 88, Ghanaian educationist and politician.
Odd Aukrust, 92, Norwegian economist. 
Bryan J. Baptiste, 52, American politician, mayor of Kauai, cardiac arrest.
Jon-Erik Beckjord, 69, American paranormal researcher, prostate cancer.
Natalia Bekhtereva, 83, Russian neuroscientist and psychologist.
George Carlin, 71, American comedian and actor (Bill & Ted's Excellent Adventure, The Prince of Tides, Dogma), heart failure.
Albert Cossery, 94, Egyptian-born French writer.
Dino Crescentini, 60, Sammarinese Olympic bobsledder. 
Jens Petter Ekornes, 66, Norwegian entrepreneur.
Dody Goodman, 93, American actress (Mary Hartman, Mary Hartman, Grease, Splash).
Jane McGrath, 42, British-born Australian cancer support campaigner, wife of Glenn McGrath, complications of cancer surgery.
Revius Ortique, Jr, 84, American jurist, first African American Louisiana Supreme Court justice, complications of a stroke.
Ron Stitfall, 82, British footballer (Cardiff City, Wales).
Fyodor Uglov, 103, Russian oldest practicing surgeon in the world.

23
Claudio Capone, 55, Italian voice actor, stroke.
Arthur Chung, 90, Guyanese politician, first president (1970–1980).
John Furlong, 75, American actor.
Vic Hershkowitz, 89, American handball player, lung disease.
Mick Hill, 60, Welsh footballer (Sheffield United, Ipswich, Crystal Palace, Wales).
Judith Holzmeister, 88, Austrian actress.
Fabrizia Ramondino, 72, Italian writer.
Vlado Taneski, 56, Macedonian journalist, murder suspect, suicide.

24
Maurice Russell Brown, 95, Canadian mining journalist.
Ruth Cardoso, 77, Brazilian anthropologist and professor, wife of Fernando Henrique Cardoso, cardiac arrhythmia.
Dave Carpenter, 48, American jazz bassist, heart attack.
Eric Chia, 74, Malaysian industrialist.
Charlie Dempsey, 86, New Zealand football official, after short illness.
Charles W. Dryden, 87, American serviceman and academic, member of the Tuskegee Airmen.
Leonid Hurwicz, 90, American economist, mathematician and 2007 Nobel laureate.
Viktor Kuzkin, 67, Russian ice hockey player, diving accident.
Mallikarjuna Rao, 57, Indian actor, leukaemia.
Shao Hua, 69, Chinese photographer, PLA major general, daughter-in-law of Mao Zedong.
Józef Szajna, 86, Polish stage director and painter, natural causes.
Ira Tucker, 83, American lead singer (The Dixie Hummingbirds), heart failure.

25
G. M. Banatwala, 74, Indian Islamic spokesman in parliament.
Gerard Batliner, 79, Liechtensteinian head of government (1962–1970).
Warren J. Ferguson, 87, American federal judge (Ninth Circuit).
Betty Hanson, 89, Manx politician, first woman elected to the Legislative Council of the Tynwald (1982–1988).
Alla Kazanskaya, 88, Russian actress, widow of Boris Barnet.
Charles Percy Parkhurst, 95, American museum curator and one of the "Monuments Men".
Bill Robinson, 86, Canadian ice hockey player.
Lyall Watson, 69, South African writer and botanist.

26
Raouf Abbas, 68, Egyptian historian.
Lilyan Chauvin, 82, French-born American actress (Baa Baa Black Sheep).
Asbjørn Haugstvedt, 81, Norwegian Christian Democratic politician.
Tony Melody, 85, British actor.
Jeanne Omelenchuk, 77, American Olympic speed skater.

27
Frédéric Botton, 71, French composer.
Marie Castello, 93, American fortune teller made famous in Bruce Springsteen's 4th of July, Asbury Park (Sandy).
Francesco Domenico Chiarello, 109, Italian penultimate national survivor of World War I.
Peter Dickson, 65, Australian Olympic rower, posterior cortical atrophy.
Günter Dohrow, 80, German Olympic athlete. 
Sasha Gabor, 63, Hungarian-born Norwegian pornographic actor, heart failure.
Alex Garbowski, 86, American baseball player (Detroit Tigers).
Vinicio Gómez, 48, Guatemalan interior minister, helicopter crash.
Kalevi Heinänen, 81, Finnish Olympic basketball player.
Raymond Lefèvre, 78, French conductor.
Sam Manekshaw, 94, Indian field marshal and chief of Army Staff, bronchopneumonia.
Daihachi Oguchi, 84, Japanese master of taiko drumming, car accident.
Leonard Pennario, 83, American concert pianist, complications of Parkinson's disease.
Lenka Reinerová, 92, Czech author.
Polk Robison, 96, American college basketball coach, natural causes.
Michael Turner, 37, American comic book artist and publisher, chondrosarcoma.

28
Irina Baronova, 89, Russian ballerina, last of the three "Baby Ballerinas".
Bruce Bodle, 73, New Zealand cricketer.
John Bonetti, 80, American professional poker player, cancer.
Douglas Dollarhide, 85, American first black mayor of Compton, California.
Terry Fields, 71, British MP for Liverpool Broadgreen (1983–1992), lung cancer.
Sangeen Wali Khan, 49, Pakistani politician, lung cancer.
Ruslana Korshunova, 20, Kazakhstani model, fall from height ruled a suicide by the police.
Nicolae Linca, 79, Romanian Olympic gold medal-winning boxer (1956).
Kenneth Macke, 69, American retail executive, complications of Parkinson's disease.
Ronnie Mathews, 72, American jazz pianist.
Christopher "Crip" McWilliams, 44, Irish member of the INLA, convicted murderer, cancer.
Stig Olin, 87, Swedish actor and songwriter.
Robert Seamans, 89, American space scientist, Deputy Administrator of NASA (1965–1968).
Robert Lewis Shayon, 95, American writer and radio producer, pneumonia.

29
Arthur R. Albohn, 86, American politician.
William R. Bennett, Jr., 78, American physicist, esophageal cancer.
Don S. Davis, 65, American character actor (Twin Peaks, Stargate SG-1, A League of Their Own), heart attack.
Ben Kinsella, 16, English murder victim, stabbing.
Eladio Vicuña Aránguiz, 97, Chilean prelate of the Roman Catholic Church, pneumonia.
Vladimir Vinogradov, 52, Russian banker.
Hewitt Wilson, 84, British Anglican priest, Chaplain-in-Chief of the RAF.

30
Frances Bult, 95, Australian Olympic swimmer.
Anthony Crockett, 62, Welsh Anglican prelate, Bishop of Bangor (2004–2008).
Just An Excuse, 9, New Zealand Standardbred racehorse, euthanasied.
Kewal Krishan, 84, Indian politician, speaker of the Punjab Legislative Assembly (1973–1977, since 2002), heart attack.
Arthur Ryan Smith, 89, Canadian politician, serviceman and Order of Canada recipient, cancer.
Ángel Tavira, 83, Mexican musician and actor, kidney complications.

References

2008-06
 06